The French Industrial Exposition of 1844, held in a temporary structure on the Champs-Élysées in Paris, was the tenth in a series of eleven French national industrial expositions held since 1798 to encourage improvements in progressive agriculture and in technology.

History 

The exposition lasted 60 days, with 3,960 exhibitors.
It opened in the Champs-Élysées on 1 May and closed on 29 June.
In the 1844 exposition it was found necessary to exclude retailers who did not make their own products, and to eliminate anything that was not socially useful, which included both freak artisan products and instruments used only by scientists.
Entrants had to fill out a form that gave information about their business including its nature, number of employees, materials used, export and domestic earning and so on. The king of France, Louis Philippe I, opened the exposition and toured all the exhibits. Hector Berlioz composed and conducted the Hymne à la France, a great symphonic and choral work performed during the opening.
Several vaudeville skits were performed during the exposition.

The king came back every Monday to examine some exhibits in more detail. There were 3,969 exhibitors, with most exhibits held in forty galleries in the grand hall. Exhibits were placed in the categories: Fabrics, Metals and other Minerals, Machinery, Precision Instruments, Chemical Arts, Fine Arts, Pottery, and Diverse Arts. The jury finished judging the exhibits on 25 July 1844. Louis Philippe presided over an award ceremony on 29 July 1844 in the Tuileries. He personally presented 31 Legion of Honour medals to the most distinguished exhibitors. In all there were 3,253 awards.

Legion of Honour awards
Legion of Honour awards were:

Notable and unusual
Gold medal: Louis-Georges Mulot in the category 'Machines'
Adolphe Sax presented an example of the saxhorn.
Charles Xavier Thomas of Colmar presented the arithmometer.
Jean-Baptiste Sabatier-Blot presented his daguerreotypes, and received an honourable mention.
Others
 Andreé, founder, in the Val d'Osne foundry, Osne-le-Val, Haute-Marne
 Frédéric Bacot, manufacturer of sheets, in Sedan, Ardennes
 Claude-Joseph Bonnet, silk manufacturer, in Lyons, Rhône
 Bontemps, manufacturer of glassware, in Choisy-le-Roi, Seine
 Bourdon, director of the forges and foundries of Le Creusot, Saône-et-Loire
 J. J. Bourkardt, manufacturer of machines, in Guebwiller, Haut-Rhin
 Buron, manufacturer of optical instruments, in Paris
 Jean-François Cail, manufacturer of machines, in Paris
 Camu fils, wool spinner, in Reims, Marne
 Charrière, manufacturer of surgical instruments, in Paris
 Théodore Chennvière, manufacturer of sheets, in Elbeuf, Seine-Inférieure
 François Debuchy, manufacturer of linen, wool and cotton fabrics, in Lille, Nord
 Fauler ainé, maker of Morocco leather products, in Choisy-le-Roi, Seine
 Etienne Faure, manufacturer of ribbons, in Saint-Étienne, Loire
 Victor Frerejean, master of ironworks, in Vienne, Isère
 Girard, tissue printer, in Rouen, Seine-Inférieure
 Godard fils, manufacturer of crystals, in Baccarat, Meurthe
 Grillet ainé, manufacturer of shawls, in Lyon, Rhône
 Jacques Gros, manufacturer of cotton fabrics, in Wesserling, Haut-Rhin
 Jean-Justin Lacroix, paper maker, in Angoulême, Charente
 Théodore Lefebvre, manufacturer of white lead, at Moulins-lès-Lille, Lille, Nord
 Lemire, manufacturer of chemical products, in Choisy-le-Roi, Seine
 Massenet, manufacturer of steel and iron, in Saint-Étienne, Loire
 Milliet, manufacturer of porcelain, in Montereau, Seine-et-Marne
 Ogereau, tanner, in Paris
 Pecqueur, manufacturer of machines, in Paris
 Roller, piano player, in Paris
 Augustin Roswag, manufacturer of metallic fabrics, at Sélestat, Bas-Rhin
 Charles Henri Schattenmann, director of the mining company of Bouxwiller, Bas-Rhin
 Antoine Thénard, chief engineer of bridges and highways, in Abzac, Gironde
 Joseph-Thaddeus Winnerl, manufacturer of timepieces, in Paris

Influence
Though it was the tenth Paris exposition, it began to spawn imitators elsewhere in the world, including the 1851 Great Exhibition in London, which was open to international exhibitors from the entire world and outshone the highly successful French exhibition. Other European expositions soon followed: Bern and Madrid in 1845; Brussels with an elaborate industrial exposition in 1847; Bordeaux in 1847; Saint Petersburg in 1848; and Lisbon in 1849. The exposition returned to Paris in 1849, called the Exposition of the Second Republic or Exposition Nationale des produits de l’industrie agricole et manufacturière, with 5,494 exhibitors and was replaced in 1855 by an international exhibition.

References

Sources

July Monarchy
World's fairs in Paris
1844 in France
1840s in Paris
1844 festivals
Festivals established in 1844

fr:Expositions_universelles_de_Paris#Exposition_nationale_de_1844